Séamus Hearne (1932 - 7 November 2008) was an Irish hurler who played as a midfielder for the Wexford senior team.

Born in Curracloe, County Wexford, Hearne first arrived on the inter-county scene at the age of seventeen when he first linked up with the Wexford minor team. He joined the senior panel during the 1951 championship. Hearne later became a regular member of the starting fifteen, and won two All-Ireland medals, three Leinster medals and two National League medals on the field of play. He was an All-Ireland runner-up on one occasion.

As a member of the Leinster inter-provincial team on a number of occasions, Hearne won one Railway Cup medal. At club level he played with Ardcolm, Shelmaliers, Midleton and Blackrock, winning one championship medal.

Throughout his career Hearne made 16 championship appearances. He retired from inter-county hurling following the conclusion of the 1959 championship.

Honours

Player

Blackrock
Cork Senior Hurling Championship (1): 1956

Wexford
All-Ireland Senior Hurling Championship (2): 1955, 1956
Leinster Senior Hurling Championship (4): 1951 (sub), 1954, 1955, 1956
National Hurling League (2): 1955–56, 1957–58

References

1932 births
2008 deaths
Midleton hurlers
Blackrock National Hurling Club hurlers
Wexford inter-county hurlers
Leinster inter-provincial hurlers
All-Ireland Senior Hurling Championship winners